Anthem to Beauty is a music documentary about the making of the Grateful Dead albums Anthem of the Sun and American Beauty.  It originally aired  in a somewhat shortened version in 1997 as part of the television series Classic Albums.  It was released on VHS video tape in 1998 and on DVD in 1999, with a running time of 1 hour 15 minutes.

Synopsis
The video combines footage from the early years of the Grateful Dead with 1997 interviews of former band members and associates.  Phil Lesh, Mickey Hart, Bob Weir, Robert Hunter, and David Grisman, among others, discuss the creation of 1968's experimental, psychedelic Anthem of the Sun and 1970's folk-rock classic American Beauty.  They also listen to and analyze the original master recordings for the albums, and talk about being in (or working with) the Grateful Dead at that time.  Recording engineer Stephen Barncard rolls the original master tape and solos tracks, recalling the recording sessions and highlighting specific moments.

Keyboardist Tom Constanten discusses the artificiality of appearing on Hugh Hefner's show Playboy After Dark. David Grisman plays his full version of the mandolin part for Ripple, as he had intended.

Track listing
The track listing for the DVD release is:
Introduction
"Truckin'" (Garcia, Hunter, Lesh, Weir)
"Candyman" (Garcia, Hunter)
Celebration
American Beauty Album Cover Creation
1965 — Beginnings
Neal Cassady
A Record Contract on Their Own Terms
"The Other One" (Kreutzmann, Weir)
Tom Constanten
Anthem of the Sun Album Cover Creation
"Born Cross-Eyed" (Weir)
David Crosby
"Mountains of the Moon" (Garcia, Hunter)
"St. Stephen" (Garcia, Hunter, Lesh)
"China Cat Sunflower" (Garcia, Hunter)
"Attics of My Life" (Garcia, Hunter)
"Friend of the Devil" (Garcia, Dawson, Hunter)
"Ripple" (Garcia, Hunter)
"Sugar Magnolia" (Weir, Hunter)
"Box of Rain" (Lesh, Hunter)
"Brokedown Palace" (Garcia, Hunter)
End credits

Credits
 Jeremy Marre – director
 Nick de Grunwald, Bous de Jong – executive producers
 Caroline Thomas – series associate producer
 Chips Chipperfield – series consultant
 Terry Shand, Geoff Kempin – executive producers for Castle Music Pictures
 Phil McDonald – editor
 Joel Wykeham – series production manager
 Mike Shoring – sound recordist
 Richard Gibb, Mike Elwell – camera
 David Gans – consultant

References

Grateful Dead
Rockumentaries
1997 films
Classic Albums films
1990s English-language films